Devario spinosus is a freshwater fish endemic to Myanmar.

References

Fish of Myanmar
Fish described in 1870
Devario